Hiroshi Sugawara (菅原 浩志) is a Japanese film director, film producer, and screenwriter.

Filmography

Director
 Seven Days' War (1988)
 That's Cunning! Shijo Saidai no Sakusen (1996)
 Tokimeki Memorial (1997)
 Magnitude (1997)
 Dreammaker (1999)
 Drug (2001)
 Fireflies: River of Light (2003)
 Hayazaki no Hana (2006)- Forget-me-not 
 Song of Kamuy (2023)

Producer
 Legend of Eight Samurai: Satomi Hakken-den (1983)
 Aijou Monogatari (1984)
 The Closest Island to Heaven: Tengoku ni Ichiban Chikai Shima (1985)
 Second Generation is Christian: Nidaime wa Kurisuchan (1985)
 Cabaret (1986)
 Three Penny Opera (1989)
 Shogun (1990)
 Ruby Cairo (1993)

Screenwriter
 Seven Days' War (1988)
 Magnitude (1997)
 Dreammaker (1999)
 Fireflies: River of Light (2003)
 Hayazaki no Hana (2006)

Production Manager
 Ten to Chi to: Heaven and Earth (1990)

References

External links
 
 
 
 
 Hayazaki no Hana （早咲きの花）

1955 births
Japanese film directors
Japanese film producers
Living people